Randiana, or Excitable Tales is an anonymously written pornographic novel originally published by William Lazenby in 1884. The book depicts a variety of sexual activities, including incest, defloration and lesbianism.

References

1884 British novels
British pornography
Lesbian erotica
Incest pornography